The volcanoes of Kamchatka are a large group of volcanoes situated on the Kamchatka Peninsula, in eastern Russia. The Kamchatka River and the surrounding central side valley are flanked by large volcanic belts containing around 160 volcanoes, 29 of them still active. The peninsula has  a high density of volcanoes and associated volcanic phenomena, with 29 active volcanoes being included in the six  UNESCO World Heritage List sites in the Volcanoes of Kamchatka group, most of them on the Kamchatka Peninsula.

Geography
The highest volcano is Klyuchevskaya Sopka (4,750 m or 15,584 ft), the largest active volcano in the Northern Hemisphere, while the most striking is Kronotsky, whose perfect cone was said by celebrated volcanologists Robert and Barbara Decker to be a prime candidate for the world's most beautiful volcano. Somewhat more accessible are the three volcanoes visible from Petropavlovsk-Kamchatsky: Koryaksky, Avachinsky, and Kozelsky. In the center of Kamchatka is Eurasia's  world-famous Geyser Valley which was partly destroyed by a massive mudslide in June 2007.

Owing to the Kuril–Kamchatka Trench, deep-focus seismic events and tsunamis are fairly common. A pair of megathrust earthquakes occurred off the coast on October 16, 1737, and on November 4, 1952, in the magnitude of ~9.3 and 8.2 respectively. A chain of more shallow earthquakes were recorded as recently as April 2006.

List of volcanoes from north to south 

Kluchevskaya group
Shiveluch, 3307 m
Klyuchevskaya Sopka
Bezymianny
Kronotsky
Avachinskaya group
Aag
Arik
Koryaksky
Avachinsky
Kozelsky
Ksudach
Ilyinsky
Kambalny
Karymsky Kamchatka's most active and continuously erupting volcano

Out of sequence:
Tolbachik
Komarov
Zhupanovsky

See also 
List of volcanoes in Russia

References

External links 

Holocene Volcanoes in Kamchatka, Institute of Volcanology and Seismology Kamchatka, Russia

 
Volcanoes of Kamchatka Krai
Landforms of the Kamchatka Peninsula
World Heritage Sites in Russia